The USC Trojan Marching Band, also known as the Spirit of Troy, represents the University of Southern California (USC) at various collegiate sports, broadcast, popular music recording, and national public appearance functions.

The Spirit of Troy is the only collegiate band to have two platinum records. The group has performed with numerous celebrities including John Williams, Michael Jackson, Diana Ross, Radiohead, Beyoncé, Doc Severinsen, George Clinton, Fleetwood Mac, The Three Tenors, John Dolmayan, Shavo Odadjian, Odesza, and The Offspring. In addition, the band has performed for five U.S. presidents, at the Summer Olympics, and on the Academy Awards, Grammy Awards, and the season 7 finale of American Idol.

A contingent of the band has performed at every USC football game, home and away, since 1987. It also makes an international trip at least every other year.

The Trojan Shrine, the symbol of USC and popularly known as "Tommy Trojan", was originally supposed to be named "The Spirit of Troy".

History
The TMB's first recorded performance was in November 1918 when, at the end of World War I, members of the TMB led a victory parade of America's returning servicemen in New York City.  "Fight On", the fight song of the university was composed in 1922 and became a part of the TMB tradition.  In 1923, the school's alma mater, "All Hail", was composed by a member of the TMB, Al Wesson.  The TMB gave its first national radio concert on CBS on April 19, 1929.  The band participated in the 1932 Summer Olympics held in Los Angeles, forming the Olympic Braid in the opening ceremonies in the Los Angeles Memorial Coliseum (coincidentally USC's home stadium).

After wearing various uniforms over the years, particularly those with a military style, the band began using basic, unadorned Trojan-style helmets and uniforms in 1950.  Three years later, the TMB adopted "Conquest", a song composed by Alfred Newman for the film Captain from Castile as a victory march.  The TMB made its first trip outside of California in 1954, traveling to Portland, Oregon to play a USC-Oregon game that the Trojans would win, 24–14.  During the Grammy Awards of 1966, TMB trumpet alumnus Herb Alpert won three Grammy Awards, including Record of the Year.  Arthur C. Bartner took over the program in 1970, and began shaping the band into its current form.  Women were allowed to join the band in 1972.

After several more uniform changes, the TMB began using more elaborate Trojan helmets with brushes, visors, and ear flaps in 1972.  In 1973 the TMB began its tradition of sending the full band to games at USC-Notre Dame rivalry games at Notre Dame Stadium.

In 1979, the TMB was invited by Fleetwood Mac to perform and record "Tusk", the title song for the album Tusk. The album went double-platinum and was adopted as a part of the TMB's traditional selections. Additionally, the band later played on another multi-platinum Fleetwood Mac album, The Dance (1997).

During the 1984 Summer Olympics in Los Angeles, Bartner directed an 800-member All American College Marching Band, 125 of whom were members of the TMB.  The year 1987 featured several significant moments for the band: the TMB trumpets performed the fanfare for Pope John Paul II in his visit to Los Angeles, the band performed during Super Bowl XXI in Pasadena, and the band began its current streak of attending all USC home and away football games.  In 1988, the TMB performed again at Super Bowl XXII in San Diego, and at the Expo '88 World's Fair held in Brisbane, Australia, during that nation's bicentennial

The band took several more international trips in the 1990s, including to the Berlin Wall after its fall, Amsterdam, Brussels, Innsbruck, Japan, the then-EuroDisneyLand in France, the Seville Expo '92, and to France to commemorate the 50th Anniversary of the D-Day Landings.  The band also participated in Super Bowl XXIV in New Orleans and the opening ceremony of the 1994 FIFA World Cup.  In 1993, USC alumnus and then U.S. Representative Christopher Cox welcomed the band from the floor of the Congress.

In 2003, the TMB performed during the Chinese New Year celebration in Hong Kong, a year later it also played at the Great Wall of China, Xi'an, Shanghai as well as returning to Hong Kong for the Chinese New Year.  The TMB participated in Expo 2005 in Nagoya, Japan, while also performing in Tokyo and Kyoto.  In 2006 the TMB went to Italy and performed in Venice, Florence and in front of the Colosseum of Rome.  In 2010, the band traveled to Shanghai, China, once again to play for United States National Day at the 2010 World Expo and in 2014 for the grand opening of the first Old Navy flagship store in China. In 2016 the band became the first American performing group invited to participate in Macau's Chinese new year parade.

At the end of the 2016 season, the TMB appeared in the 103rd Rose Bowl. This marked the 34th time USC has played in the "Granddaddy of Them All".

In 2014, the Spirit of Troy was declared the best marching band in college football by USA Today's "College Football Fan Index."

The Spirit of Troy also appeared at Expo 2015 in Milan, Italy to perform as part of the American Pavilion's Fourth of July celebration. This was the band's fifth appearance at a World Expo.

In 2019, the Spirit of Troy elected its first female drum major.

On November 22, 2019, an announcement was made on the USC website that Saturday (November 23, 2019) will be Bartner's last appearance as band director at a home football game in his career. "Bartner will then return for the 2020 football season in a reduced role in order to ensure an orderly transition to the new director. Bartner will officially retire on Jan. 1, 2021."

Ties to the entertainment industry
The Spirit of Troy has appeared in several movies and television shows, including:

Amazon Women on the Moon, in the "Titan Man" segment
America's Funniest Home Videos, for the $100,000 grand prize in Season 2
America's Got Talent
The Croods
Doogie Howser, M.D., in the episode "Dances With Wanda"
Fame
Forrest Gump, as the Alabama Band
Glee
Grease 2, as the Rydell High School Band
Hello, Dolly!
How I Met Your Mother
The Last Boy Scout
The Gong Show Movie
The Leeza Gibbons Show
The Little Rascals
The Music Man
The Naked Gun: From the Files of Police Squad!
Scrubs, in the episode "My Best Friend's Baby's Baby and My Baby's Baby"
Sgt. Bilko
That's Entertainment II
The Tonight Show with Conan O'Brien
The Tonight Show Starring Jimmy Fallon
Two-Minute Warning
Win, Lose or Draw, College Week 1988, starring NYU, SMU, UCLA, Georgia Tech, Northwestern & Washington
 You Don't Know Jack, one episode
 The Late Late Show with James Corden, one episode

The band also appeared in the Academy Award shows of 1976 and 2000 as well as at the 2004 Grammy Awards with OutKast. During the 2009 Grammy Awards, it accompanied Radiohead's performance of "15 Step".   The band appeared with Beyoncé Knowles and Hugh Jackman on the 81st Academy Awards in 2009.  The Spirit of Troy was used for the opening broadcast of ESPN's West Coast SportsCenter from Los Angeles.  The television drama House used a section of the Spirit of Troy to play an April Fools' Day prank on its cast during taping. In 2009, the band played on the show Dancing with the Stars.  The USC drum line performed with Tommy Lee at the 2009 Guitar Center Drum Off. On April 17, 2010, the band performed "Welcome Home" with Coheed and Cambria at the Coachella Music Festival.  In fall 2010, the band was used to film the promo video for the return of the television show Hawaii Five-0.

The band has played at the Hollywood Bowl's "Tchaikovsky Spectacular" for over 20 years, helping supplement the Los Angeles Philharmonic during the  1812 Overture finale.

People

Directors
J. Paul Elliott (1914–?)
Harold Roberts (1926–1936)
Clarence Sawhill (1947–1952)
William A. Schaefer (1952–1958)
Gary Garner (1958–1963)
Ronald Broadwell (1963–1970)
Arthur C. Bartner (1970–2020)
Jacob Vogel (2021–Present)

Notable members
Erik Aadahl
Herb Alpert
Michael Ausiello
Charlie Bisharat
Harry Blackstone, Jr.
Ken Dye
Larry Harmon
Damon Intrabartolo
Jessy J
Kevin Norton, of The Brian Setzer Orchestra
Richard M. Sherman
Ernie Smith
Tommy Walker
Mark Watters

See also
 "Fight On"
 "Tribute to Troy"

References

Sources
2019 Press Pack
About USC: The von KleinSmid Era (via The Wayback Machine)

External links

USC Marching Band named 3rd Best College Marching Band by CollegeSports-Fans.com

The Spirit of Troy on Twitter
The Spirit of Troy on Facebook
The Spirit of Troy on YouTube

College marching bands in the United States
Pac-12 Conference marching bands
USC Trojans
Musical groups established in 1918
1918 establishments in California